The 2018 NBA Africa Game was an exhibition basketball game played on August 4, 2018 in the Sun Arena at Time Square in Pretoria, South Africa. It was the third NBA game to take place on the continent of Africa, and continued with the format of Team Africa versus Team World.

The series followed its previous format of a team of players of African origin or immediate descent against an assortment of other players, with the 2018 Team World roster consisting almost entirely of players from the United States, with one Italian. In a first for the series, each roster included one female member, each a retired alumna from the WNBA.

Team World led for the vast majority of the game, with Team Africa, led by Joel Embiid, pulling to within three points in the final minute of play. Team Africa missed several attempts at what would have been the tying three-point shot; Team World scored the clinching free throw with 5 seconds remaining.

Rosters

References 

2018–19 NBA season
2018 in African basketball
2018 in South African sport
International basketball competitions hosted by South Africa
National Basketball Association games
NBA Africa Game